The Yinggeling National Nature Reserve is a nature reserve in Hainan, China.

It is located deep between the mountains of Hainan Island and so far scientists have not properly explored it. The Kadoorie Conservation China Department (KCC) conducted a pilot study in 2003 and was stunned by the size of the primary rainforest and its rich biodiversity.

In 2016, two new species of plants were discovered, which were found only in the Yinggeling National Nature Reserve, namely Cladopus yinggelingensis and Terniopsis daoyinensis.

References

Tourist attractions in Hainan
Nature reserves in Hainan